Arrhyton procerum, the Zapata long-tailed racerlet or Zapata long-tailed groundsnake is a species of snake in the family Colubridae. It is found in Cuba.

References 

Arrhyton
Reptiles described in 1992
Reptiles of Cuba
Taxa named by Stephen Blair Hedges